Anna Alice Chapin (December 16, 1880 – February 26, 1920) was an American author and playwright. She wrote novels, short stories, fairy tales and books on music, but is perhaps best remembered for her 1904 collaboration with Glen MacDonough on the child's book adaptation of the Babes in Toyland operetta.

Early life
Anna Alice Chapin was born in New York City, the daughter of Dr. Frederick Windle Chapin and the former Anna J. Hoppin. Her father, a native of Providence, Rhode Island, attended Trinity College, Hartford and received his medical degree from New York University. Her mother was most likely a close relative of the architect Howard Hoppin (1854–1940), who designed several buildings in the Pomfret Street Historic District, including the Chapin home. Chapin received a private education and studied music under Harry Rowe Shelley.

Career
Chapin published her first book, The Story of the Rhinegold, when she was  just 17 years old. Her other works would include: Wonder Tales from Wagner (1898); Wotan, Siegfried, and Brunhilde (1898); Masters of Music (1901); The True Story of Humpty Dumpty: How He Was Rescued by Three Mortal Children in Make Believe Land, Illustrated & Decorated by Ethel Franklin Betts (1905); Discords (1905); The Heart of Music (1906); Königskinder (1911); The Nowadays Fairy Book (1911); The Street-Car Mystery (1911); The Spirit of the Sea (1912); The Topsy Turvy Fairy (1913); The Eagle's Mate (1914); The Every Day Fairy Book (1915); Mountain Madness (1917);  and Jane (1920). 

Chapin also wrote many short stories for magazines and newspaper syndication.

The Deserters
Chapin wrote a play, produced in New York City in 1910, entitled The Deserters, written with her husband, Robert Peyton Carter, a stage actor who often worked with Maude Adams. In 1919 The Deserters was released as the film  Sacred Silence, with William Russell and Agnes Ayres.

Film
Several of Chapin's stories were adapted for film between 1914 and 1961. The Eagle's Mate was produced in 1914 with Mary Pickford and James Kirkwood, Sr. in the starring roles. In 1920 Mountain Madness came out with a cast led by Mignon Anderson, Harold Miller (1894-1972) and Ora Carew. The Girl of Gold written with Cleveland Moffett first appeared in the magazine Snappy Stories as a serial running from December, 1919 to March, 1920 and was produced as a film with Florence Vidor, Malcolm McGregor and Alan Roscoe in 1925. The libretto Babes in Toyland was first seen on film in 1934 as a vehicle for Laurel and Hardy and again in 1961 with Ray Bolger, Tommy Sands and Annette Funicello.

Bibliography

Personal life
Chapin married Robert Peyton Carter, a stage actor who often worked with Maude Adams, in 1906.

Chapin, aged 39, died after a short illness at her residence on West Thirteenth Street, New York City. She was preceded in death, on June 8, 1918, in Monrovia, California, by her husband, Robert Peyton Carter, who had appeared on stage as recently as March 1918 supporting Maude Adams in A Kiss for Cinderella. and often together in Peter Pan

Sources

External links
 
 
 Anna Alice Chapin - free eBooks at google books
 
 Anna Alice Chapin Carter at findagrave

19th-century American novelists
American women short story writers
Writers from New York City
1880 births
1920 deaths
20th-century American novelists
American women novelists
20th-century American women writers
19th-century American women writers
19th-century American short story writers
20th-century American short story writers
Novelists from New York (state)